The SAN File System (SFS) is a high-performance, clustered file system created by the company DataPlow.  SFS enables fast access to shared files located on shared, storage area network (SAN)-attached storage devices.  SFS utilizes the high-speed, scalable data transfers inherent to storage area networks and is a general-purpose file system for a wide variety of environments, including scientific computing, finance, healthcare, entertainment, defense, broadcast, and aerospace.

Platforms 

It is supported on Linux, Solaris, OS X, and Windows.

Supports all SAN-based, block-level storage protocols including Fibre Channel and iSCSI.

Features and specifications 

Interoperability 	

 Supports NFS and CIFS/Samba file serving
 Supports virtual machine software: Microsoft, VMWare, and Zen
 Supports all major backup software
 SAN features: virtualization, zoning, snapshots, mirroring, and redundant network connections

Security 	
    
 High security mode
 UNIX: POSIX compliant permissions
 Windows: Access control lists (ACLs)

Specifications 	
   
 ASCII, UNICODE, and UTF-8 filename character encoding
 Supports binary executables
 User-level (Advisory) record locking
 Journaling for fast recovery
 Extent addressable storage minimizes fragmentation
 UNIX: Volume attaches to mount-point
 Windows: Volume attaches to drive letter
 Buffered, synchronous, asynchronous, direct, and memory mapped I/O

Limits

 255 character filename length
 Unlimited pathname length
 8 Exabyte file size
 64 Exabyte volume size

References

External links
 

Computer file systems
Disk file systems
Network file systems
Shared disk file systems